Haji Mirza Hassan Tabrizi (میرزا حسن تبریزی; July 4, 1851, Tabriz – December 12, 1944, Qom), famously known as Hassan Roshdieh (حسن رشدیه), was an Iranian cleric, teacher, politician, and journalist. He introduced some modern teaching methods in Iran, especially in teaching the alphabet. These are still used to some degree in Iran's primary schools.

Hassan Roshdieh was an ethnic Iranian Azerbaijani and began studying as a Twelver Shi'a cleric there, Roshdieh abandoned his plans of going to Najaf to study in religious schools after reading an article about the hardships of education in the Persian language from the newspaper Akhtar. He left for Beirut in 1880 and studied for two years in its Daar ul-Mu'allimeen (teacher school), and then continued with visiting Istanbul and Egypt. In 1883, he left for Yerevan and founded the first modern school for Muslims there. In his new method of teaching, Roshdieh used the concept of sounds instead of alphabetic letters to teach the Persian and Azeri languages, which use the Arabic script.  During his four years of managing his school in Yerevan, Roshdieh wrote Vatan Dili (The Language of the Homeland) in Azerbaijani, which was taught in several schools of the Caucasus as a primer until the October Revolution.

It was during his stay in Yerevan that Roshdieh met Nasser-al-Din Shah, who took him to Nakhichevan. Roshdieh later returned to his birthplace in Tabriz, where he established the first primary schools in Iran in 1886 or 1887. While Ahmad Kasravi has claimed in his book that the primary school was established with the help of Ali Khan Amin od-Dowle, the then Premier of Iran, this cannot be confirmed by the records of Fakhreddin Roshdieh, Mirza Hassan's son.

The schools were highly rejected by the more conservative Tabrizis, especially clerics, alleging that Roshdieh is trying to make the students quit Islam, mentioning the school ring and its similarity to church bells. This resulted in mobs destroying some of his schools (which resulted in a few students being killed or injured), unsuccessful assassination attempts using guns, and later a fatwa against the modern schools, which finally resulted in him fleeing Tabriz.

In Tehran, and during the reign of Mozzafar-al-Din Shah and the prime ministership of Amin od-Dowle, Roshdieh started the Roshdieh School with the help of the government. He was a member of the political Ma'āref Association and was active in the fight for freedoms and the constitution during the Iranian Constitutional Revolution, leading to him being exiled or fleeing Iran a few times.

After a final return to Iran, Roshdieh established a new school and a magazine in 1904, both called Maktab. He finally quit his political and educational activities in 1927 and moved to Qom, where he died in 1944 and is buried.

Roshdieh is claimed to be the first Azerbaijani to write poems for children. He also had plans for the education of  blind people and had helped to establish girl schools in Iran. He has several books and articles in Persian and Azerbaijani. He was called Roshdieh after the name of primary schools in the then Ottoman Empire, roshdiyye, because he had established the first such schools in Iran.

Roshdieh is mentioned in a famous poem of Nima Youshij, yād-e ba’zi nafarāt (The Memory of Some People).

Mirza Ahmad Modarress Avval
Educated scholar Haj Mirza Ahmad Modarres Avval, along with Mirza Hassan Roshdieh, played a major role in establishing and managing the first schools opened in Tabriz city. His children, including Mohammad Shahandeh, Mirza Hossein Modarress zadeh, Akbar Modarress Avval (Shiva), Mirza Jafar Modarress Avval, and Razieh Modarress Avval, Mahmoud Modarres Aval have also worked closely with him in management and teaching.

Sources 
 The Memory of Some People, an article in Iran about Roshdieh and his legacy
 The Persian Encyclopedia's article on Roshdieh, Volume 1, pages 1085 and 1086.
 Archive of Mirza Hassan Roshdieh Papers at the International Institute of Social History

1851 births
1944 deaths
People of the Persian Constitutional Revolution
People from Tabriz
19th-century Iranian people
20th-century Iranian educators